Choi Byung-Chul (Hangul: 최병철, Hanja: 崔秉哲; ; born October 24, 1981) is a South Korean foil fencer.
 
Choi made his first major international appearance by winning gold in the individual foil and bronze in the team foil at the 2001 Junior World Fencing Championships. In 2007, he won the bronze medal in the foil team event at the World Fencing Championships in Saint Petersburg, Russia.

Choi qualified for the 2008 Beijing Olympics for the men's individual foil competition. On August 13, 2008, he had a 15–14 loss to the eventual silver medalist Yuki Ota of Japan in the round of 16. Choi then participated in the 2012 London Olympics and on July 31, 2012, he lost to Alaaeldin Abouelkassem in the semi-final, but beat Andrea Baldini in the bronze medal match to finally capture the bronze medal.

Achievements
 2007 World Fencing Championships, Team foil
 2012 London Olympics, Individual foil

References

1981 births
Living people
South Korean male foil fencers
Fencers at the 2004 Summer Olympics
Fencers at the 2008 Summer Olympics
Fencers at the 2012 Summer Olympics
Olympic fencers of South Korea
Olympic bronze medalists for South Korea
Olympic medalists in fencing
Asian Games medalists in fencing
Medalists at the 2012 Summer Olympics
Fencers at the 2002 Asian Games
Fencers at the 2006 Asian Games
Fencers at the 2010 Asian Games
Asian Games gold medalists for South Korea
Asian Games silver medalists for South Korea
Asian Games bronze medalists for South Korea
Medalists at the 2006 Asian Games
Medalists at the 2010 Asian Games
Medalists at the 2002 Asian Games
20th-century South Korean people
21st-century South Korean people
Byung-chul